The following is a list of ecoregions in Eritrea, as identified by the Worldwide Fund for Nature (WWF).

Terrestrial ecoregions
by major habitat type

Tropical and subtropical moist broadleaf forests

 Ethiopian montane forests

Tropical and subtropical grasslands, savannas, and shrublands

 East Sudanian savanna
 Sahelian Acacia savanna
 Somali Acacia–Commiphora bushlands and thickets

Montane grasslands and shrublands

 Ethiopian montane grasslands and woodlands

Deserts and xeric shrublands

 Eritrean coastal desert
 Ethiopian xeric grasslands and shrublands

References
 Burgess, Neil, Jennifer D’Amico Hales, Emma Underwood (2004). Terrestrial Ecoregions of Africa and Madagascar: A Conservation Assessment. Island Press, Washington DC.
 Thieme, Michelle L. (2005). Freshwater Ecoregions of Africa and Madagascar: A Conservation Assessment. Island Press, Washington DC.

 
ecoregions
Eritrea